The mayor of Lucena is the head of the local government of the city of Lucena City, Quezon who is elected to three year terms. The Mayor is also the executive head and leads the city's departments in executing the city ordinances and improving public services. The city mayor is restricted to three consecutive terms, totaling nine years, although a mayor can be elected again after an interruption of one term.

Municipal Mayors (1902-1961)

City Mayors (2001-Present)

References

Lists of mayors of places in the Philippines